The Lin Yutang House is a former residence in Shilin District, Taipei, Taiwan that belonged to Lin Yutang.

History
The house was constructed in 1966.

Architecture
The house was designed by its owner Lin Yutang in a traditional Chinese style, with four walls enclosing an interior courtyard. It was constructed with blue tiles and white walls. The house consists of a small library displaying a collection of Lin's writings and photos of Lin.

Transportation
The house is accessible by bus from Shilin Station of Taipei Metro.

See also
 List of tourist attractions in Taiwan

References

External links

 

1966 establishments in Taiwan
Houses completed in 1966
Houses in Taiwan
Tourist attractions in Taipei